St Mary Magdalene's Church, Creswell is a Grade II listed parish church in the Church of England in Creswell, Derbyshire.

History

The foundation stone was laid on Tuesday 23 May 1899 by William Cavendish-Bentinck, 6th Duke of Portland. It was built to designs by the architect Louis Ambler at a cost of £4,500, the gift of the Duke. The contractor was Messrs Burman and Sons of Stamford.

It was consecrated on 17 May 1900 by Rt. Revd George Ridding, Bishop of Southwell.

The vestry was added in 1906 at a cost of £250.

The Aisles were added in 1914. The tower was built in 1927 at a cost of £4,000 which included a peal of 8 bells from John Taylor of Loughborough.

Organ
The organ was built at a cost of £450 and opened with a recital on 21 September 1900 by Harrison Cooper, organist of St Andrew's Presbyterian Church, Sheffield.

Stained glass windows
The stained glass windows include two by Clare Dawson of 1951, the east window and the Miners' Memorial.

References

Creswell
Grade II listed churches in Derbyshire
Churches completed in 1900